Thamiaraea hospita is a species of rove beetle native to Europe.

References

Staphylinidae
Beetles described in 1844
Beetles of Europe